The 1949 Texas Longhorns baseball team represented the University of Texas in the 1949 NCAA baseball season. The Longhorns played their home games at Clark Field. The team was coached by Bibb Falk in his 7th season at Texas.

The Longhorns won the College World Series, defeating the Wake Forest Demon Deacons in the championship game.

Roster

Schedule

Awards and honors 
Ed Kneuper
 First Team All-American
 First Team All-SWC

Tom Hamilton
 First Team All-American
 First Team All-SWC
 College World Series Most Outstanding Player

Jim Shamblin
 First Team All-SWC

Murray Wall
 First Team All-American
 First Team All-SWC

Don Watson
 First Team All-SWC

References 

Texas Longhorns baseball seasons
College World Series seasons
NCAA Division I Baseball Championship seasons
Texas Longhorns
Southwest Conference baseball champion seasons
Texas Longhorns